Thullal may refer to:

Kolam Thullal, a ritual dance form prevalent in south Kerala, India
Ottan Thullal, an art form in Kerala state, India
Sarpam Thullal (Dance of Snakes), a ritual dance in Kerala, India
Thullal (film), a 2007 Indian adult drama film written and directed by Praveen Gandhi